La Bête Humaine (English: The Human Beast and Judas Was a Woman) is a 1938 French film directed by Jean Renoir, with cinematography by Curt Courant. The picture features Jean Gabin and Simone Simon, and is loosely based on the 1890 novel La Bête humaine by Émile Zola.

La Bête Humaine is partially set "on a train that may be thought of as one of the main characters in the film." Although generally listed as a romantic drama, it is sometimes considered a precursor to the film noir genre.

Plot
The film opens with a quote from Zola's novel, one of his "Rougon-Macquart" series, emphasizing a character's fate as tied to the hereditary alcoholism that runs through his family's generations. The film itself, however, represents only a portion of the novel and veers from Zola's overriding theme of naturalistic fatalism.

Lantier is a railway engine driver obsessively tied to his locomotive, in part because his work distracts him from recurring headaches and violent rages that happen when he is with a woman and become worse when he drinks. During a stop for repairs in Le Havre, Lantier goes to his aunt's nearby village. He tells her he no longer has the attacks of violence, but then has one when he meets Flore (Blanchette Brunoy), an attractive young woman he knew as a little girl. The two walk and sit beside the railway, but as they embrace, his hands tighten on her neck, and he is stopped from strangling her only by the distracting roar of a passing train. Knowing of his condition, she forgives him.

Roubaud, the deputy stationmaster at Le Havre, is married to Séverine (Simone Simon), who formerly worked for her wealthy godfather Grandmorin (Jacques Berlioz). Roubaud now accuses her of once having had an affair with Grandmorin, and she confirms that he took advantage of her. Roubaud demands that she be present as he takes his revenge. They arrange to be aboard the same train as Grandmorin; Roubaud and Séverine go to his compartment and Roubaud stabs the man to death. However, while in the corridor between compartments, they meet Lantier, who is a passenger on the same train. With Roubaud's encouragement, Séverine asks Lantier not to tell the police what he knows, and the murder is pinned on a habitual criminal, Cabouche (played by the director).

Afterwards, Séverine and Roubaud are both haunted by the murder in different ways, and Séverine turns to Lantier for comfort. Meeting in secret during a rainstorm, their passion is suggested by an overflowing rain barrel as they begin an affair. Roubaud has lapsed into depression following the murder; Séverine tells Lantier that her husband will eventually kill her and suggests that Lantier strike first.

Lantier is unable to carry out an attack on Roubaud, but when Séverine at her home tells Lantier that she will leave Roubaud, he agrees to try again. Just then, the couple hear a noise and think that Roubaud is approaching. Lantier then has one of his seizures and kills Séverine. Returning to his locomotive for another run to Paris, he confesses to his fireman Pecqeaux (Julien Carette), then attacks him, then finally leaps from the moving train to his death. After safely stopping the engine and walking back to Lantier's body, Pecqeaux remarks that Lantier now looks more peaceful than he had for a long time.

Cast
 Jean Gabin as Jacques Lantier
 Simone Simon as Séverine Roubaud
 Fernand Ledoux as Roubaud (as Ledoux Sociétaire de la Comédie Française)
 Blanchette Brunoy as Flore
 Gérard Landry as Le fils Dauvergne
 Jenny Hélia as Philomène Sauvagnat
 Colette Régis as Victoire Pecqueux
 Claire Gérard as Une voyageuse
 Charlotte Clasis as Tante Phasie, la marraine de Lantier
 Jacques Berlioz as Grandmorin
 Tony Corteggiani as Dabadie, le chef de section
 André Tavernier as Le juge d'instruction Denizet
 Marcel Pérès as Un lampiste
 Jean Renoir as Cabuche
 Julien Carette as Pecqueux

Production
Jean Gabin wanted to star in a film about locomotives and wrote a screenplay called Train d'Enfer, that was originally to be directed by Jean Grémillon. Dissatisfied with the script, Grémillon suggested an adaptation of La Bête humaine. After his success starring in Renoir's Grand Illusion (1937), Gabin preferred to work with Jean Renoir again, and hired him instead of Grémillon. Renoir eventually wrote the script over a period of eight to fifteen days. (Renoir said it took him twelve days in the introduction to the movie). After its completion, Renoir read the screenplay to Gabin's producer Robert Hakim, who asked for "trifling modifications".

Renoir confessed that at the time when he wrote the screenplay, he had not read Zola's novel in over 25 years: "While I was shooting, I kept modifying the scenario, bringing it closer to Zola ... the dialogue which I gave Simone Simon is almost entirely copied from Zola's text. Since I was working at top speed, I'd re-read a few pages of Zola every night, to make sure I wasn't overlooking anything."

Filming commenced on August 12, 1938, with exteriors on the Gare Saint-Lazare and at Le Havre. Due to running time restrictions, Renoir had to omit several celebrated occurrences from the novel.

Reception

Critical response
Frank Nugent, critic for The New York Times, gave La Bête Humaine a positive review even though he felt uncomfortable watching the film, writing:

Accolades
Nominations
 Venice Film Festival: Mussolini Cup, Best Film, Jean Renoir; 1939.

References

Further reading
 Tibbetts, John C., and James M. Welsh, eds. The Encyclopedia of Novels Into Film (2nd ed. 2005) pp 30–31.

External links
 
 
 
 La Bête Humaine at Bright Lights Film Journal
 La Bête Humaine information site and DVD review at DVD Beaver (includes images)
 La bête humaine: Renoir On and Off the Rails an essay by Geoffrey O'Brien at the Criterion Collection
 

1938 films
1938 crime drama films
1930s French-language films
French crime drama films
French black-and-white films
Films based on works by Émile Zola
Films based on French novels
Adultery in films
Rail transport films
Films directed by Jean Renoir
Films produced by Robert and Raymond Hakim
Films scored by Joseph Kosma
1930s French films